The Dr. James House was a historic house at West Center and South Gum Streets in Searcy, Arkansas.  It was a two-story brick building, with a gabled roof and a brick foundation.  A shed-roofed porch extended around its front and side, supported by square posts.  It was built about 1880, and was one of a modest number of houses surviving in the city from that period when it was listed on the National Register of Historic Places in 1991.  The house has been reported as demolished to the Arkansas Historic Preservation Program, and is in the process of being delisted.

See also
National Register of Historic Places listings in White County, Arkansas

References

Houses on the National Register of Historic Places in Arkansas
Houses completed in 1880
Houses in Searcy, Arkansas
National Register of Historic Places in Searcy, Arkansas
Demolished buildings and structures in Arkansas
1880 establishments in Arkansas